Events in the year 1989 in Paraguay.

Incumbents
 President: Alfredo Stroessner (until 3 February), Andrés Rodríguez (from 3 February)

Events 
2–3 February: 1989 Paraguayan coup d'état
1 May: 1989 Paraguayan general election

References 

 
Paraguay
Paraguay
1980s in Paraguay
Years of the 20th century in Paraguay